Mount Harvey is the name of five mountains:

North America
Mount Harvey (Alberta), 56 km SE of Grande Cache, Alberta, Canada
Mount Harvey (Babine Mountains), in the Bulkley Country region of British Columbia, Canada
Mount Harvey (British Columbia), in the Atlin District of British Columbia, Canada, located 41 km N of Skagway, Alaska
Mount Harvey (Britannia Range), located northeast of the Village of Lions Bay, British Columbia, Canada

Antarctica
Mount Harvey (Antarctica)